is a junction passenger railway station in the city of Ichikawa, Chiba, Japan, operated by East Japan Railway Company (JR East) and Tokyo Metropolitan Bureau of Transportation (Toei Subway). It is the only station on the Toei Subway that is located in Chiba Prefecture.

Lines
Moto-Yawata Station is served by the Chūō-Sōbu Line of JR East and the Toei Shinjuku Line subway. The 23.5 kilometer Toei Shinjuku Line terminates at this station.

Station layout
The station is divided into two sections: the elevated JR station and the underground subway station. The areas outside the ticket gates of the two sections are connected by a passage.

JR Platforms
The JR station has one island platform serving two tracks. There is no platform for rapid and limited express services on the two other tracks of the Sōbu Main Line.

Toei Platforms
The subway station also has one island platform serving two tracks. While one end of the subway station is connected to the JR East station, the other end is connected to Keisei Yawata Station on the Keisei Main Line.

History 
The station opened on the Sōbu Main Line on September 1, 1935. The Toei Shinjuku Line was extended to this station on March 19, 1989.

Passenger statistics
In fiscal 2018, the JR portion of the station was used by an average of 60,125 passengers daily (boarding passengers only).  The Toei Subway portion of the station was used by 40,500 passengers daily

Surrounding area
 Ichikawa City Hall

See also
 List of railway stations in Japan

References

External links 

Moto-Yawata Station (JR East) 
Motoyawata Station (Toei Subway)

Railway stations in Japan opened in 1935
Railway stations in Chiba Prefecture
Sōbu Main Line
Ichikawa, Chiba